Eric Wilborts (born 20 June 1964) is a Dutch former professional tennis player.

Wilborts was a left-handed player from Tilburg who was ranked as high as three in the world junior rankings as a 16 year old. He was runner-up to Mike Falberg in the boys' singles final at the 1980 US Open.

While competing on the professional tour he reached a career high singles ranking of 269. His Grand Prix (ATP Tour) appearances include a win over Pat Du Pré at Rotterdam in 1981, where he was beaten in the next round by Jimmy Connors. He was a singles quarter-finalist at the 1981 Tel Aviv Open.

Between 1981 and 1983 he competed in four Davis Cup ties for the Netherlands, winning five of eight singles rubbers.

See also
List of Netherlands Davis Cup team representatives

References

External links
 
 
 

1964 births
Living people
Dutch male tennis players
Sportspeople from Tilburg